Ullatan is an apparently extinct and unclassified Southern Dravidian language once spoken by two Scheduled tribes of India. Speakers shifted to Malayalam.

References

Dravidian languages